Airola may refer to:
 Airola, a comune (municipality) in the Province of Benevento in Italy
 Angelica Veronica Airola, Italian Baroque painter
 Jerry Airola, Founder and CEO of Silver State Helicopters

See also
Areola